The 2018 Tour Down Under was a road cycling stage race, that took place between 16 and 21 January 2018 in and around Adelaide, South Australia. It was the 20th edition of the Tour Down Under and the first race of the 2018 UCI World Tour.

Daryl Impey became the first South African rider to win the race overall, after edging out 's Richie Porte on countback after both riders completed the course in the same time. Porte won on Willunga Hill for the fifth year in succession, but Impey finished eight seconds in arrears in second position, which was enough to take the ochre jersey.

In the race's other classifications, world champion Peter Sagan won the sprints classification, taking five top-five stage finishes during the event, including a stage win into Uraidla. 's Nicholas Dlamini led the mountains classification from start to finish, while Egan Bernal of  took the young rider classification in his first start for the team, finishing sixth overall.

Participating teams
As the Tour Down Under was a UCI World Tour event, all eighteen UCI WorldTeams were invited automatically and obliged to enter a team in the race. One other team was given a wildcard entry into the race: UniSA–Australia. Each team was due to enter seven riders, for a total of 133 participants. However,  withdrew Bjorg Lambrecht from the race following an error with the UCI's anti-doping procedures, while  lost Kristoffer Halvorsen following a crash in the closing metres of the People's Choice Classic, which resulted in a fractured hand. As a result, 131 riders started the race.

Route
The route of the 2018 Tour Down Under was announced at the beginning of July 2017 and centred around the city of Adelaide in South Australia. There were six mass-start road stages and no time trials. Two days before the start of the Tour, there was a flat criterium race, the People's Choice Classic, which took place in Rymill Park and which was suited for the sprinters. It was won by world champion Peter Sagan in a sprint finish.

The opening stage started in Port Adelaide, which hosted the race for the first time since the inaugural Tour Down Under in 1999. The fifth stage finished with two climbs of Willunga Hill, which had been decisive in previous editions of the race. The final stage was another criterium around the centre of Adelaide.

After stage two, it was announced that the third stage would be shortened due to forecasted high temperatures.

Stages

Stage 1
16 January 2018 — Port Adelaide to Lyndoch,

Stage 2
17 January 2018 — Unley to Stirling,

Stage 3
18 January 2018 — Glenelg to Victor Harbor,

Stage 4
19 January 2018 — Norwood to Uraidla,

Stage 5
20 January 2018 — McLaren Vale to Willunga Hill,

Stage 6
21 January 2018 — Adelaide,

Classification leadership table
In the 2018 Tour Down Under, four different jerseys were awarded. For the general classification, calculated by adding each cyclist's finishing times on each stage, and allowing time bonuses for the first three finishers at intermediate sprints and at the finish of mass-start stages, the leader received an ochre jersey. This classification was considered the most important of the 2018 Tour Down Under, and the winner of the classification was considered the winner of the race.

Additionally, there was a sprints classification, which awarded a green jersey, a change from red in 2017. In the sprints classification, cyclists received points for finishing in the top 10 in a stage. For winning a stage, a rider earned 15 points, with one point fewer per place down to 6 points for 10th place. Points towards the classification could also be accrued at intermediate sprint points during each stage; these intermediate sprints also offered bonus seconds towards the general classification. There was also a mountains classification, the leadership of which was marked by a white jersey with navy polka dots. In the mountains classification, points were won by reaching the top of a climb before other cyclists, with more points available for the higher-categorised climbs.

The fourth jersey represented the young rider classification, marked by a white jersey. This was decided in the same way as the general classification, but only riders born after 1 January 1994 were eligible to be ranked in the classification. There was also a classification for teams, in which the times of the best three cyclists per team on each stage were added together; the leading team at the end of the race was the team with the lowest total time. In addition, there was a combativity award given after each stage to the rider(s) considered, by a jury, to have "instigated the most attacks, breakaways or assisted their teammates to the best advantage".

Notes

References

External links

2018
2018 UCI World Tour
2018 in Australian sport
January 2018 sports events in Australia